Locust Grove, Ohio may refer to the following places in Ohio, United States:
Locust Grove, Adams County, Ohio
Locust Grove, Licking County, Ohio
Locust Grove, Mahoning County, Ohio
Locustgrove, Ohio, in Clark County